Leck (Mooring North Frisian: Leek) is a municipality in the district of Nordfriesland, in Schleswig-Holstein, Germany. It is situated approximately 30 km north of Husum, and 30 km west of Flensburg.

It is also home to the former Leck Air Base.

References

Nordfriesland